WGTE-TV (channel 30) is a PBS member television station in Toledo, Ohio, United States. It is owned by the Public Broadcasting Foundation of Northwest Ohio alongside NPR member WGTE-FM (91.3). The two stations share studios on South Detroit Avenue in Toledo; WGTE-TV's transmitter is located on Corduroy Road in Oregon, Ohio.

History

WGTE began in 1953 as a low-power television station on the University of Toledo campus, with a broadcast antenna in the belltower of University Hall. It began regular operations in 1959, receiving a full license on October 10, 1960.

WGTE has been digital-only since February 17, 2009.

In 2017, WGTE announced that it will not have to make any changes as a result of the spectrum auction, and will be allowed to remain on UHF 29. WGTE plans to broadcast in ATSC 3.0 in the future, and there are plans to broadcast in 4K Ultra HD, support mobile television, support 3-D broadcasting, and more technological advances.

Subchannels
The station's digital signal is multiplexed:

Signal coverage
WGTE can be received in quite a large part of the Detroit area; its over-the-air signal reaches far into Detroit's southern inner-ring suburbs. The station has long claimed southeastern Michigan as part of its primary coverage area, and even airs some Michigan-related programming.

Over-the-air coverage
WGTE's over the air signal reaches as far north as Taylor, Michigan, as far south as Findlay, Ohio, as far east as Sandusky, Ohio, and as far west as Wauseon, Ohio. The station's signal radius to the north is significantly reduced due to co-channel interference from CIII-DT-29 in Sarnia, Ontario, which also broadcasts on channel 29. That station however, is moving to channel 35. Coverage of WGTE should extend to Hamtramck, Michigan.

Cable coverage
WGTE is carried on most cable systems in northwestern Ohio. In addition, the station and all of its subchannels are available on Comcast in Melvindale, Ann Arbor and Lenawee County, Michigan, as well as on Wyandotte Municipal Cable and Buckeye Cable in the Toledo area and in the areas of Michigan where Buckeye is available. The station has not been carried on any cable systems in Canada (specifically Windsor and Essex County, Ontario) since the late 1980s.

References

External links
Official website

PBS member stations
GTE-TV
Television channels and stations established in 1960
1960 establishments in Ohio